Remigius van Leemput, known in England simply as Remee, (19 December 1607 – 4 November 1675) was a Flemish portrait painter, copyist, collector and art dealer mainly active in England.

Life

Van Leemput was born in Antwerp. He is believed to have moved to London around 1632.  He was a close associate of Anthony van Dyck and may have assisted this Flemish master in his studio.  He produced copies of van Dyck’s work and later also of other painters such as Peter Lely.  Van Leemput is said to have claimed that he could copy Lely better than Lely could himself.  He may have been an assistant of Lely at some point.

Van Leemput gained a prominent position in the London art world. He became an art dealer and a major collector of paintings and drawings.  After the execution of Charles I of England in 1649, his art collection was broken up and sold off in order to repay the debtors of the former king.  Van Leemput was active as a buyer of artworks sold off from the royal collection.  He acquired 35 paintings and sculptures from the sale of the collection over a period of six months.  He purchased works from Titian, Giorgione, Correggio and Andrea del Sarto.  He was able to acquire the famous equestrian portrait by van Dyck of Charles I with M. de St Antoine.  He tried to sell the painting in Antwerp but was unsuccessful because his asking price of 1,500 guineas was too high.  It is possible that he was in fact trying to sell a copy of the portrait he had made himself.  After the Restoration in 1660, the painting was still with him.  It was recovered from him for Charles II through legal proceedings.

His son Giovanni Remigio later became a copyist in Rome, and his daughter Mary also became an artist and married Thomas Streater, the brother of the artist Robert Streater.

Remigius van Leemput died in London.

Work

Remigius van Leemput is known for his original works as well as for his small-scale copies after van Dyck, Lely and others.  He made a series of portraits of Ladies after van Dyck, Lely and Samuel Cooper.  The series are bust portraits based on (often full-length) portraits by these other painters.  They are part of the Royal Collection.  He also made a copy of Lely’s double portrait of Henry Hyde, Viscount Cornbury and Theodosia, Viscountess Cornbury.

In 1667 Charles II commissioned van Leemput to make a small copy of the wall painting by Hans Holbein the Younger representing Henry VII, Elizabeth of York, Henry VIII and Jane Seymour at the Palace of Whitehall in London.  Van Leemput received a fee of £150 for the copy.  Van Leemput painted another copy of the mural in 1669 (Petworth House, Petworth, West Sussex, England).  The two copies are the only records of Holbein’s entire composition, destroyed by fire in 1698 after a maid left her washing to dry before an open fire.  Holbein's original draft cartoon for the left half of the composition is in the National Portrait Gallery, London.

Portraits

References 

Flemish Baroque painters
Flemish portrait painters
Artists from Antwerp
1607 births
1675 deaths
Art collectors from Antwerp
Belgian expatriates in England